Horaglanis krishnai, the Indian blind catfish, is a species of airbreathing catfish endemic to India, mainly in wells and underground water channels around Kottayam, Kerala. It lacks pigmentation and eyes, like other cavefish, and reaches about 4.2 cm (1.7 inches) in total length.

References 

Horaglanis
Catfish of Asia
Cave fish
Freshwater fish of India
Fish described in 1950
Taxonomy articles created by Polbot